is a Japanese manga series written by Garon Tsuchiya and illustrated by Nobuaki Minegishi. The narrative follows the protagonist Shinichi Gotō, a man who, after a decade of incarceration in a private prison, is suddenly freed. After his release, Gotō must find his captors and discover the reason for his confinement.

Old Boy was serialized in the Futabasha magazine Weekly Manga Action from 1996 to 1998, with a total of 79 chapters among eight collected volumes released during that time. The series was picked up for North American localization by Dark Horse Comics and released between 2006 and 2007. The manga was also adapted into an award-winning South Korean film, directed by Park Chan-wook in 2003. In 2013, Spike Lee directed an American remake of the 2003 Park Chan-wook film.

Plot
Intoxicated and confused, 25-year-old Shinichi Gotō finds himself in a small room inside a private jail after being kidnapped and imprisoned during one fateful night for unknown reasons. Despite his pleadings, none of the guards will tell him who kidnapped him or why he is being held captive. As the days go by, his forced isolation slowly takes a toll on his sanity. He finds an outlet through training his mind and body for the day he will be able to wreak vengeance. 

After ten years of solitary confinement in a maximum security cell, with only a television for company, he is suddenly released. Once outside, he encounters a much changed world. His long imprisonment ripped him from society and kept him from having the normal life he desired. With nothing to lose, he begins his mission to hunt down the identities of his captors and uncover the reason behind his imprisonment. However, it seems that the unidentified person behind Shinichi's captivity is not finished with him just yet, and thus begins a twisted game where only the winner survives.

Characters

The leading protagonist of the story who was mysteriously captured and held hostage for a decade.
Takaaki Kakinuma
The main villain of the story, who was once an elementary school classmate of Gotō and is now seeking revenge for Gotō inadvertently shattering his sense of self-worth.
Yukio Kusama
A writer and former teacher. She was Gotō and Kakinuma's 6th grade teacher.
Eri
A lady who became Goto's girlfriend. She is actually a paid actress under hypnosis placed upon her by Kakinuma.
Kyoko Kataoka
Takaaki Kakinuma's henchwoman.

Media

Manga
Old Boy was serialized in the Futabasha magazine Weekly Manga Action from 1996 to 1998. A total of 79 chapters among eight tankōbon (collected volumes) were released in Japan from May 28, 1997 to October 28, 1998. Between June 19 and July 17, 2007, Futabasha re-released the entire series in five, larger volumes. In 2005, Dark Horse Comics bought the rights to make an English translation of the book for its customers worldwide. All eight volumes were released from July 5, 2006 to October 10, 2007.

Volumes

Films
In 2003, it was adapted into the award-winning Korean film Oldboy by South Korean director Park Chan-wook. The film was a huge international success and went on to win various awards including the Grand Prix of the Jury at the 57th Cannes Film Festival awards ceremony.

In 2006, an Indian version titled Zinda and directed by Sanjay Gupta received flak for being an unofficial, unauthorized remake.

A subsequent American film remake of the Korean film was directed by Spike Lee in 2013.

Reception
In 2007, the Old Boy manga won an Eisner Award in the category of "Best U.S. Edition of International Material - Japan." Eduardo Chavez of Mania.com noted that "titles like Old Boy... take their time to create a wonderful of paranoia and drama". Anime News Network's Carlo Santos praised the artwork, which "fits the tone of the series well" and the pacing of the story, but mentioned poorly developed characters.

References

External links

Page at Dark Horse Comics
 

Action anime and manga
Dark Horse Comics titles
Eisner Award winners
Futabasha manga
Manga adapted into films
Psychological thriller anime and manga
Anime and manga about revenge
Seinen manga
Suspense anime and manga